Adriano Silva may refer to:
Adriano Silva (Brazilian politician, born 1970), a Brazilian politician (1970–2020);
Adriano Silva (Brazilian politician, born 1978), a Brazilian politician born in 1978, the current mayor of Joinville.